Margaret Dayton (born 1949) is an American politician from Utah. A member of the Republican Party, she served longer in the Utah Legislature than any other woman in Utah history. After serving a decade in the Utah House of Representatives, she unseated an incumbent senator in 2006 and served in that position until June 2018, when she resigned for medical reasons.

She represented the 15th Senate District which includes parts of Provo, Orem, Vineyard, Lindon and Pleasant Grove.

Personal life, education, and career
Growing up in a military family, Dayton attended schools in five states. She graduated from Merced High School (California) and earned a Bachelor of Science in Nursing from Brigham Young University. Dayton worked for several years as a registered nurse. In 1977, she married Lynn T. Dayton, a physician.
Shortly after her marriage, Dayton chose to put aside her career as a nurse to become a full-time stay at home mother. The Daytons have five children.

She is a member of the Church of Jesus Christ of Latter-day Saints.

Political career

In 1996, Dayton was appointed by Utah governor Mike Leavitt to fill out the remaining four months of the term of Rep. Lee Ellertson in Utah House District 61, a seat for which she was already running. She defeated Independent American Party candidate Gordon Norman with 90% of the vote in the election to retain the seat.

In 2006, Dayton ousted Republican incumbent Parley G. Hellewell to win the Republican nomination for the Utah Senate, and handily defeated Democrat Bethanie Newby in the November 2006 general election.  Dayton won re-election in 2014 with over 80% of the vote against her Democratic challenger.

Dayton served in Senate leadership, and on the following committees:
 
Natural Resources, Agriculture, and Environmental Quality Appropriations Subcommittee
Retirement and Independent Entities Appropriations Subcommittee
Senate Government Operations and Political Subdivisions Committee 
Senate Natural Resources, Agriculture, and Environment Committee – Chair
Water Development Commission - Senate Chair

Dayton has been awarded an Honorary Doctorate from the Utah System of Higher Education, is a recipient of the Friend of Taxpayer Award and is included annually in Top Business Friendly Legislators.

In 2017, Dayton announced that she would run to fill the vacancy caused by Jason Chaffetz resigning from Congress.

Election

Legislation

2016 sponsored bills

Notable legislation 
In 2013, Dayton sponsored a bill that would require Utah to collect data on women who undergo abortions, including their race and their reason for doing so. Dayton, who is known for her opposition to legal abortion, wants to restrict the pathway to abortion in Utah. The Governor signed the bill on 22 March 2013. In 2016, Dayton questioned whether the state should be providing housing to the homeless through House Bill 346, asking if the "bill is based on the assumption that housing is a right the government is obligated to provide? Is that why we are providing tax payer money for that?" Dayton voted against the bill; however, it still passed both chambers and was signed by the Governor on March 25, 2016.

Boards, affiliations, and awards

Utah Valley University Executive Advisory Board 
College of Eastern Utah Board of Trustees 
Honorary Doctorate from USHE 
Utah Medical Association Alliance 
Utah Hospital Association Annual Recipient 
Guardian of Small Business Award 
Defender of Free Enterprise Awards 
Friend of Taxpayer Award, Utah Taxpayers Association
Member of the National Rifle Association
Cub Scout Leader
President, PTA
Member of the National Rifle Association
Defender of Free Enterprise
Teddy Roosevelt Award from Sportsman for Fish and Wildlife

References

1949 births
Dayton, Marageret
Republican Party members of the Utah House of Representatives
Brigham Young University alumni
Republican Party Utah state senators
Women state legislators in Utah
Latter Day Saints from Washington (state)
21st-century American politicians
21st-century American women politicians
20th-century American women politicians
20th-century American politicians
Latter Day Saints from Utah
Latter Day Saints from California